Jiang Shan (born 1980) is a former Chinese badminton player. Jiang played for the Guangxi team in the national event, and was the runner-up in the men's doubles event at the National Championships tournament. He was the silver and bronze medalists at the 1998 IBF World Junior Championships in the boys' and mixed doubles event respectively. Jiang competed at the 1997 Asian Junior Championships, winning a gold in the boys' team and a bronze in the mixed doubles event. He also captured two gold medals in 1998, in the boys' team and mixed doubles event, and a silver medal in the boys' doubles.

Achievements

World Junior Championships 
Boys' doubles

Mixed doubles

Asian Junior Championships 
Boys' doubles

Mixed doubles

IBF International 
Men's doubles

References

External links
 

Chinese male badminton players
Badminton players from Guangxi
Living people
1980 births
21st-century Chinese people